Benjamin Martin Wilcox (June 21, 1854 in Fleming, Cayuga County, New York – August 1912) was an American manufacturer and politician from New York.

Life
He was the son of Joseph Wilcox and Lydia (Martin) Wilcox. He attended the public schools in Auburn. In 1870, he became a messenger, and later a clerk in the County Clerk's office. He was Deputy County Clerk from 1877 to 1882; and Clerk of Cayuga County from 1883 to 1891. Afterwards he engaged in the manufacture of ladies' shoes.

He was a member of the New York State Assembly (Cayuga Co.) in 1894 and 1895.

He was a member of the New York State Senate from 1896 to 1908, sitting in the 119th, 120th, 121st, 122nd, 123rd, 124th, 125th, 126th, 127th, 128th, 129th (all eleven 39th D.), 130th and 131st New York State Legislatures (both 41st D.).

He was buried at the Fort Hill Cemetery in Auburn.

Sources
 The New York Red Book compiled by Edgar L. Murlin (published by James B. Lyon, Albany NY, 1897; pg. 174f, 404 and 510f)
 Sketches of the members of the Legislature in The Evening Journal Almanac (1895; pg. 52)

External links
 

1854 births
1912 deaths
Republican Party New York (state) state senators
Politicians from Auburn, New York
Republican Party members of the New York State Assembly
People from Fleming, New York
19th-century American politicians